Truckin' Up to Buffalo is a double CD soundtrack to the DVD video of the same name by the Grateful Dead. It was recorded at Rich Stadium in Orchard Park on July 4, 1989. There are no differences in the track listings of the CD and DVD versions. Two tracks had already been released: "All Along the Watchtower" was included in the compilation of Dylan songs, Postcards of the Hanging, and "Man Smart (Woman Smarter)" was released on Weir Here – The Best of Bob Weir. The album title is taken from a line in the band's song "Truckin'," though it was not included in the setlist that night.

Track listing

Disc one
First Set:
"Bertha" > (Robert Hunter, Jerry Garcia) - 7:57
"Greatest Story Ever Told" (Hunter, Mickey Hart, Bob Weir) - 4:36
"Cold Rain and Snow" (traditional, arr. Grateful Dead) - 6:45
"Walkin' Blues" (Robert Johnson) - 6:57
"Row Jimmy" (Hunter, Garcia) - 10:50
"When I Paint My Masterpiece" (Bob Dylan) - 6:09
"Stagger Lee" (Hunter, Garcia) - 6:01
"Looks Like Rain" > (John Barlow, Weir) - 7:11
"Deal" (Hunter, Garcia) - 7:53
Second Set:
"Touch of Grey" > (Hunter, Garcia) - 6:30
"Man Smart, Woman Smarter" (Norman Span) - 8:47
Note

Disc two
"Ship of Fools" > (Hunter, Garcia) - 8:13
"Playing in the Band (reprise)" > (Hunter, Hart, Weir) - 3:30
"Terrapin Station" > (Hunter, Garcia) - 12:18
"Drums" > (Hart, Bill Kreutzmann) - 9:00
"Space" > (Garcia, Phil Lesh, Weir) - 7:28
"I Will Take You Home" > (Brent Mydland) - 3:53
"All Along the Watchtower" > (Dylan) - 5:52 
"Morning Dew" > (Bonnie Dobson, Tim Rose) - 11:10
"Not Fade Away" (Buddy Holly, Norman Petty) - 10:08
Encore:
"U.S. Blues" (Hunter, Garcia) - 6:03
Note

Personnel

Grateful Dead
Jerry Garcia – guitar, vocals
Bob Weir – guitar, vocals
Phil Lesh – electric bass, vocals
Brent Mydland – keyboards, Hammond B3, vocals
Mickey Hart – drums, percussion
Bill Kreutzmann – drums, percussion

Production
 Jimmy Edwards – executive producers
 James Austin – executive producers
 Len Dell'Amico - co-producer, director
 John Cutler – recording
 Jeffrey Norman – mixing
 David Lemieux – tape archivist
 Eileen Law – archival research
 Richard Biffle – cover art
 Brian Connors – art coordination
 Robert Minkin – photos, package design & production
 Susana Millman – photos
 Blair Jackson – liner notes
 Sheryl Farber – editorial supervision
 Scott Webber – project coordination

Charts
Album - Billboard

Notes

References

Gatta, John Patrick. "Truckin' Up To Buffalo (Part One of An Interview with Grateful Dead Archivist David Lemieux)", Jambands.com, July 9, 2005

Grateful Dead live albums
2005 live albums
Grateful Dead Records live albums
2005 soundtrack albums
Film soundtracks
Grateful Dead soundtracks
Grateful Dead Records soundtracks